is a Japanese motorcycle racer. He competes in the MFJ All Japan Road Race JSB1000 Championship, aboard a Suzuki GSX-R1000. He has previously competed in the MFJ All Japan Road Race JSB1000 Championship, the MFJ All Japan Road Race GP250 Championship and the MFJ All Japan Road Race J-GP2 Championship, where he was champion in 2012.

Career statistics

Grand Prix motorcycle racing

By season

Races by year
(key) (Races in bold indicate pole position; races in italics indicate fastest lap)

Supersport World Championship

Races by year
(key) (Races in bold indicate pole position; races in italics indicate fastest lap)

References

External links

Living people
1990 births
Japanese motorcycle racers
250cc World Championship riders
Moto2 World Championship riders
Supersport World Championship riders
Suzuki MotoGP riders
MotoGP World Championship riders